Reggie Christian Hearn (born August 14, 1991) is an American professional basketball player who last played for the Memphis Hustle of the NBA G League. He played college basketball at Northwestern University.

High school
Hearn was an undersized post player while at R. Nelson Snider High School, in Fort Wayne, Indiana, and he was lightly-recruited by college programs and receive no D-1 scholarship offers.

College career
Hearn landed as a walk-on at Northwestern, for head coach Bill Carmody, on a recommendation from Princeton head coach Mitch Henderson. He ultimately earned a scholarship, and became a standout player for the team, by his junior season. As a senior, in the 2012–13 season, Hearn averaged 13.4 points and 4.6 rebounds per game, earning Honorable Mention All-Big Ten Conference.

Professional career

Idaho Stampede (2013–2014)
Following his college basketball career, Hearn joined the Idaho Stampede of the NBA Development League (now called the NBA G League).

Reno Bighorns (2014–2018)
Hearn played for the Stampede for a full season, and part of another, before being traded to the Westchester Knicks, and ultimately landing with the Reno Bighorns. With the Bighorns, he earned a reputation of one of the G League's top three-point shooters. 

During the 2016–17 season, Hearn was selected to compete in the three-point contest at the 2017 NBA Development League All-Star Game.

On October 10, 2017, Hearn was signed by the Sacramento Kings to a training camp deal.

Detroit Pistons (2018)
On January 15, 2018, Hearn signed a one year, two-way contract with the Detroit Pistons. Hearn made his NBA debut on February 5, playing 2:33 in a 111–91 win against the Portland Trail Blazers and making a three point field goal. The points were the first NBA points by a former Northwestern Wildcat since Geno Carlisle in December 2004, the first by a Northwestern graduate since Evan Eschmeyer in the May 2003 and the first NBA three point shot by a Wildcat since Rex Walters in the January 2000 and the first by a Northwestern graduate since Billy McKinney in 1981. Hearn appeared in a total of three games for the Pistons, but did not score again during the season.

Stockton Kings (2018–2019)
For the 2018–19 season, Hearn joined the Stockton Kings of the G League.

South Bay Lakers (2019–2020)
For the 2019–20 season, Hearn joined the South Bay Lakers of the G League. He posted 23 points, four rebounds, five assists, one steal and a block during a win against the Iowa Wolves on February 25, 2020. Hearn averaged 12.6 points and 3.4 rebounds per game.

NBA G League Ignite (2020–2021)
In October 2020, Hearn signed with the NBA G League Ignite as one of the veteran players to mentor younger prospects. He averaged 3.9 points and 2.6 rebounds in 13 games.

Memphis Hustle (2021–2022)
On August 25, 2021, Hearn signed with Fraport Skyliners of the easyCredit BBL. However, on September 16, he parted ways with the team without playing a single game. On October 23, he signed with the Memphis Hustle.

National team
In 2017, Hearn was selected to the U.S. national team competing at the 2017 FIBA AmeriCup, where he won a gold medal. 

Hearn returned to team USA in 2018, playing on two World Cup qualifying teams. In five qualifying games, he averaged 12.2 points and 4.2 rebounds, while shooting 64% from three-point range. For his efforts, Hearn was named the 2018 USA Basketball Male Athlete of the Year.

Career statistics

NBA

Regular season

|- 
| style="text-align:left;"| 
| style="text-align:left;"| Detroit
| 3 || 0 || 2.3 || .500 || .500 || .000 || 0.0 || 0.0 || 0.0 || 0.0 || 1.0
|- class="sortbottom"
| style="text-align:center;" colspan="2"| Career
| 3 || 0 || 2.3 || .500 || .500 || .000 || 0.0 || 0.0 || 0.0 || 0.0 || 1.0

College

|-
| style="text-align:left;"| 2009–10
| style="text-align:left;"| Northwestern
| 13 || 0 || 1.9 || .500 || .500 || – || .2 || .2 || .0 || .0 || .4
|-
| style="text-align:left;"| 2010–11
| style="text-align:left;"| Northwestern
| 19 || 0 || 2.5 || .385 || .333 || .875 || .2 || .2 || .1 || .1 || 1.0
|-
| style="text-align:left;"| 2011–12
| style="text-align:left;"| Northwestern
| 33 || 33 || 26.1 || .486 || .371 || .787 || 3.7 || 1.3 || .7 || .3 || 7.4
|-
| style="text-align:left;"| 2012–13
| style="text-align:left;"| Northwestern
| 30 || 30 || 33.0 || .441 || .336 || .735 || 4.6 || 1.5 || 1.2 || .4 || 13.4
|- class="sortbottom"
| style="text-align:center;" colspan="2"| Career
| 95 || 63 || 20.2 || .457 || .353 || .752 || 2.8 || 1.0 || .6 || .2 || 7.1

References

External links
NBA G League profile
G League stats @ basketball-reference.com
USA Basketball profile
Northwestern Wildcats bio

1991 births
Living people
American men's basketball players
Basketball players from Fort Wayne, Indiana
Detroit Pistons players
Grand Rapids Drive players
Idaho Stampede players
Memphis Hustle players
NBA G League Ignite players
Northwestern Wildcats men's basketball players
Reno Bighorns players
Shooting guards
Skyliners Frankfurt players
South Bay Lakers players
Stockton Kings players
Undrafted National Basketball Association players
United States men's national basketball team players